NRC, or nrc, may refer to:

Education
 NRC School
 Northern Regional College

Research centers and other establishments
 National Research Centre, Egypt
 National Research Council (Canada)
 National Research Council of Sri Lanka
 Nokia Research Center
 United States National Research Council
Other educational
 National Resource Center, U.S. Department of Education program promoting international studies and languages through grants
 National Resource Center for Health Information Technology, a part of the U.S. Department of Health and Human Services
Organizations
 Norwegian Refugee Council
 National Railroad Construction and Maintenance Association, United States
 NATO-Russia Council
 Nuclear Regulatory Commission, an independent agency of the U.S. government
Politics
 National Republican Convention, a Nigerian political party
 National Redemption Council, the ruling government in Ghana from 1972 to 1975
 National Reformation Council, a group of senior military officers who seized control of the Sierra Leone government on 23 March 1967 and was overthrown on 18 April 1968 

Science and technology
 Noise reduction coefficient
 Normal retinal correspondence

Sports
 National Rugby Championship, an Australian rugby union competition
 Newbury Racecourse, United Kingdom
 Nigel Reo-Coker, an English footballer
 No Remorse Corps, professional wrestling group
 Nottingham Rowing Club, an English rowing club
 USA Cycling National Racing Calendar, an American professional bicycle racing,

Transport
 Nigerian Railway Corporation
 NRC, the IATA code for NASA Crows Landing Airport in the state of California, US
 NRC, the National Rail code for Newbury Racecourse railway station in the county of Berkshire, UK

Other uses
 NRC (newspaper), in the Netherlands
 National Radio Club
 National Register of Citizens of India
 Nature Reviews Cancer, a monthly scientific journal of review articles covering the field of oncology
 Netherlands Reformed Congregations
 New Roc City, an American entertainment complex in New Rochelle, New York
 Nigerian Railway Corporation

See also